This article lists the full results for group stage of 2020 European Women's Team Badminton Championships. All times are Central European Time (UTC+01:00).

Group 1

Denmark vs. Netherlands

Ireland vs. Estonia

Denmark vs. Ireland

Netherlands vs. Estonia

Denmark vs. Estonia

Netherlands vs. Ireland

Group 2

Iceland vs. Lithuania

Russia vs. Belgium

Russia vs. Iceland

Belgium vs. Lithuania

Belgium vs. Iceland

Russia vs. Lithuania

Group 3

France vs. England

Belarus vs. Israel

France vs. Belarus

England vs. Israel

France vs. Israel

England vs. Belarus

Group 4

Germany vs. Slovakia

Portugal vs. Latvia

Germany vs. Portugal

Slovakia vs. Latvia

Germany vs. Latvia

Slovakia vs. Portugal

Group 5

Bulgaria vs. Ukraine

Hungary vs. Wales

Bulgaria vs. Hungary

Ukraine vs. Wales

Bulgaria vs. Wales

Ukraine vs. Hungary

Group 6

Turkey vs. Finland

Slovenia vs. Czech Republic

Turkey vs. Slovenia

Finland vs. Czech Republic

Turkey vs. Czech Republic

Finland vs. Slovenia

Group 7

Poland vs. Sweden

Scotland vs. Norway

Spain vs. Sweden

Poland vs. Norway

Poland vs. Scotland

Spain vs. Norway

Spain vs. Scotland

Norway vs. Sweden

Scotland vs. Sweden

Spain vs. Poland

References

2020 European Men's and Women's Team Badminton Championships